From Headquarters may refer to:

 From Headquarters (1929 film), an American part-talkie adventure drama
 From Headquarters (1933 film), an American murder mystery